Hoshana Rabbah is the seventh day of the Jewish holiday of Sukkot, the 21st day of the month of Tishrei. This day is marked by a special synagogue service, the Hoshana Rabbah, in which seven circuits are made by the worshippers with their lulav and etrog, while the congregation recites Hoshanot. It is customary for the scrolls of the Torah to be removed from the ark during this procession. In a few communities a shofar is sounded after each circuit.

Themes

Final judgment 
Hoshana Rabbah is known as the last of the Days of Judgment, which begin on Rosh Hashana. The Zohar says that while the judgment for the new year is sealed on Yom Kippur, it is not "delivered" until the end of Sukkot (i.e., Hoshana Rabbah, the last day of Sukkot), during which time one can still alter their verdict and decree for the new year. Consequently, an Aramaic blessing that Jews give each other on Hoshana Rabbah, פתקא טבא (pitka tava or piska tava), which in Yiddish is "A guten kvitel", or "A good note", is a wish that the verdict will be positive.

In this spirit, it is a custom in many congregations that the cantor wears a kittel as on the High Holidays. Since Hoshana Rabbah blends elements of the High Holy Days, Chol HaMoed, and Yom Tov, in the Ashkenazic tradition, the cantor recites the service using High Holiday, Festival, Weekday, and Sabbath melodies interchangeably.

In some Sephardic communities, prayers known as Selichot (forgiveness) are recited before the regular morning service (these are the same prayers recited before Rosh Hashanah). In the different prayers of this day, Syrian Jews pray in the same maqam (melody) as on the high holidays. In Amsterdam and in a few places in England, America, and elsewhere, the shofar is also sounded in connection with the processions. The latter practice reflects the idea that Hoshana Rabbah is the end of the High Holy Day season when the world is judged for the coming year. Because Hoshanah Rabbah is also linked to the high holidays as well as being a joy-filled day, in the Diaspora, some Hasidic communities such as Satmar have the custom of having Birchat Cohanim/Priestly Blessing recited during the Mussaf service. Some communities such as Bobov will only do this if it is on Friday. However, this is not the common practice outside of Israel and some Sephardic communities where the Priestly Blessing is recited daily.

Evening prior to Hoshana Rabbah 
It is customary to read the whole of Tehillim (Psalms) on Hoshana Rabbah eve. There is also a custom to read the book of Deuteronomy on the night of Hoshana Rabbah.

Rituals and customs 
The reasons for many of the customs of the day are rooted in Kabbalah.

Seven hoshanot 
The modern-day observance of the rituals of Hoshana Rabbah is intended to emulate the practices that existed in the times of the Holy Temple in Jerusalem. During Sukkot, the four species are taken in a circuit (hakafah) around the bimah of the synagogue once daily. On Hoshana Rabbah, there are seven circuits (hakafot).

Making a circuit around the bimah on Sukkot while each person holds the four species in his hands has its origin in the Temple service, as recorded in the Mishnah: "It was customary to make one procession around the altar on each day of Sukkot, and seven on the seventh day" (Sukkah 4:5). The priests carried the palm branches or willows in their hands. The entire ceremony is to demonstrate rejoicing and gratitude for a blessed and fruitful year. Moreover, it serves to tear down the iron wall that separates us from our Father in Heaven, as the wall of Jericho was encompassed "and the wall fell down flat" (Joshua 6:20). Furthermore, the seven circuits correspond to the seven Hebrew words in  - "I wash my hands in purity and circle around Your altar, O Lord".

According to Kabbalistic tradition, each circuit is done in honor of a patriarch, prophet, or king. (The list of honorees is identical to that of the honorary invitees to the sukkah according to the tradition of Ushpizin.)
 Abraham 
 Isaac 
 Jacob 
 Moses (the most important Hebrew prophet) 
 Aaron (Moses's brother, the first high priest) 
 Joseph (Jacob's most famous son) 
 David (the most important king of Israel)

Tikkun Hoshana Rabbah 
Abudarham speaks of the custom of reading the Torah on the night of Hoshana Rabbah, out of which has grown the custom of reading Deuteronomy, Psalms, and passages from the Zohar; reciting Kabbalistic prayers. In Orthodox Jewish circles, some men will stay up all night learning Torah.

Sephardim have a tradition of staying up the entire night on the eve of this day. Throughout the night in the synagogues, Torah learning takes place, and some recite Selichot prayers. The entire books of Deuteronomy is read. The reason for this is because this book is considered by some as a "review" of the entire Torah, but also because in the Torah portion cycle, the book of Deuteronomy is about to be completed the following days on Simchat Torah.  In addition, many read the entire book of Psalms.

In Hasidic communities that follow the customs of Rabbi Menachem Mendel of Rimanov, there is a public reading of the Book of Devarim (Deuteronomy) from a Sefer Torah. This may be followed by a tish in honor of the festival.

The entire book of Psalms is read, with Kabbalistic prayers being recited after each of the five sections.

Five willow branches 

At the conclusion of a number of Piyyutim (liturgical poems), five willow branches are beaten on the ground or other surfaces to symbolize the elimination of sin. This is also symbolic as a prayer for rain and success in agriculture. According to the Kabbalah, beating the ground with the five willow branches is done to "Sweeten the Five Severities". There is no blessing said for this ritual, but the Aramaic expression "chabit, chabit velah barich" ("beat, beat but don't bless") is chanted because, according to tradition, this custom of beating the willow branches was started only in the times of Ezra by the three last prophets Haggai, Zaqariah, and Malachi. 

The Midrash notes that the Aravah (willow) represents the common folk, unlearned and lacking exceptional deeds. Rabbi Abraham Isaac Kook noted that these simple people have their own contribution to the nation; they are blessed with common sense and are unencumbered by sophisticated calculations. The unusual custom to beat the willow on the ground symbolizes that these common folk provide “a natural, healthy power that is part of the arsenal of the Jewish people. We do not strike the willow. We strike with the willow.” It is important to note that the Aravah represents the unlearned and not the evildoers.

Prayers for Messiah 
In the Ashkenazic and Italian rites, the hoshanot are accompanied by a series of liturgical verses climaxing with, "Kol mevasser, mevasser ve-omer" (The voice of the Herald [Elijah] heralds and says)—expressing hope for the speedy coming of the Messiah.

Traditional foods

In Ashkenazi culture, it is traditional to eat soup with kreplach during the meal served on the day of Hoshana Rabba.

Also in Yiddish-speaking communities, some eat boiled cabbage on Hoshanah Rabbah. This is because the Hebrew phrase "Kol Mevasser (קול מבשר)" chanted on the day, sounds, when pronounced in traditional Eastern Ashkenazi pronunciation, like "koyl mit vasser (קויל מיט וואסער)", Yiddish for "cabbage with water"(cabbage in German being kohl).
Rabbi Pinchas of Koretz taught that one should bake an apple with the Hoshana branch in it to ward off toothaches in the coming year.

See also 
 Sukkot
 Hosanna

References 

Hallel
Hebrew names of Jewish holy days
Sukkot
Tishrei observances
Hebrew words and phrases in Jewish law